T. M. Kaliyannan Gounder (10 January 1921 – 28 May 2021) was an Indian politician who served as a member of the Provisional Parliament of India and as a member of the Legislative Assembly MLA, Member of the Legislative Council MLC of Tamil Nadu. He was the last surviving member of the first parliament of India (Provisional Parliament 1950–1952) and was one of the few surviving members of the first assembly of Tamil Nadu (formerly Madras) State (MLA 1952 Rasipuram, MLA 1957 Tiruchengode, MLA 1962 Tiruchengode).

Career
He was awarded Master of Arts (in English literature) from Loyola College (Madras) and Bachelor of Commerce (Pachaiyappa's College, Madras). He belonged to the Kumaramangalam Zamindar family of TN.
In 1942, TMK got a real taste of Independence activism and public life when he participated in the Quit India movement launched by Mahatma Gandhi. This and many meetings with nationalist leaders like Gandhi, C. Rajagopalachari and S. Satyamurti paved the way for  dedicating his life to public service.

On 28 January 1950, he was sworn in as a member of the Provisional Parliament of India.

He held many posts during his public career including being the President of the Salem District Board. A keen educator, Kaliyannan Gounder is said to have started more than a thousand schools during his public life. He also opened several temples and charitable organisations in Tiruchengode. Construction projects he helped bring to fruition included the Kolli Malai road network through the Kolli Hills in Namakkal Dt, Tamil Nadu. There are 70 hair pin bends in this engineering marvel. The entire ghat section was built with extremely limited funding and limited faith in the route but all went well and today the mountainous sections of the road are still in excellent condition. The Pallipalayam bridge near Erode was also constructed with his support.

He was the vice president of the Tamil Nadu Congress Committee (TNCC) when Thiru K. Kamaraj was president. A person who avoided the spotlight TMK firmly believes in the principle of "Do Good and throw it into the well". He never hankered after public glory, name or fame. His hard work and approachability made him a favourite among those who sought genuine political advice but his self-effacing approach meant that his work went unnoticed by his own party and the government.

He also held the position of Director, Indian Bank, and Director, Bharat Heavy Electricals Ltd. (Trichy) among other posts. He was elected to the Tamil Nadu legislative assembly as an Indian National Congress candidate from Rasipuram constituency in 1952 election, from Tiruchengode constituency in 1957, and 1962 elections. He was one of the two winners in the 1957 election, the other being R. Kandaswami from Congress party.

Recognition
The Tamil Nadu Government recently felicitated T.M. Kaliyannan Gounder and a few other members of the first Assembly of Tamil Nadu. He has also been conferred the honorific title of "KONGU VEL" by the Kongu Association. On his 99th birthday (10 Jan 2020) he was inducted as an Honorary member of Rotary Club of Tiruchengode.

Personal life
T.M. Kaliyannan was married to Parvathi from Kilambadi, Erode, and they had five children. He died in Thiruchengode in May 2021 at the age of 100.

References 

1921 births
2021 deaths
Indian centenarians
Men centenarians
University of Madras alumni
Members of the Constituent Assembly of India
Madras MLAs 1952–1957
Madras MLAs 1957–1962
Madras MLAs 1962–1967
Indian National Congress politicians from Tamil Nadu
People from Namakkal district